The Poncione Piancascia is a mountain of the Swiss Lepontine Alps, overlooking Brione in the canton of Ticino. It lies between the Valle Maggia and the Valle Verzasca. The Poncione di Piancascia has an elevation of 2,360 metres and is the highest summit on the range south of Pizzo delle Pecore.

References

External links
 Poncione Piancascia on Hikr

Mountains of the Alps
Mountains of Switzerland
Mountains of Ticino
Lepontine Alps